The Two Buttes Gymnasium is an ashlar sandstone-walled  single-story gym building located at 5th and C Sts. in Two Buttes, Colorado.  It was built during 1935–37 as a Works Progress Administration (WPA) project in style that has been termed WPA Rustic architecture.

The building has served as a sports facility and as a meeting hall.  It was listed on the National Register of Historic Places in 2009.

Its construction employed 36 persons, and used stone from eight separate local quarries.

References 

Sports venues on the National Register of Historic Places in Colorado
Buildings and structures completed in 1937
Buildings and structures in Baca County, Colorado
Works Progress Administration in Colorado
1937 establishments in Colorado
National Register of Historic Places in Baca County, Colorado
Sports venues completed in 1937